Pedro Maldonado, O.F.M. (died 1566) was a Roman Catholic prelate who served as Bishop of Mondoñedo (1559–1566).

Biography
Pedro Maldonado was born in Spain and ordained a priest in the Order of Friars Minor.
On 23 Jan 1559, he was appointed during the papacy of Pope Paul IV as Bishop of Mondoñedo.
He served as Bishop of Mondoñedo until his death on 2 Jul 1566.

References 

16th-century Roman Catholic bishops in Spain
Bishops appointed by Pope Paul IV
1566 deaths
Franciscan bishops